Journals is the second compilation album by Canadian singer Justin Bieber. It was released through Island Records on December 23, 2013. The album features guest appearances from R. Kelly, Chance the Rapper, Lil Wayne, Future, and Big Sean. Journals is a R&B album that sees Bieber mostly deal with themes of heartbreak and forgiveness in a romantic relationship. To achieve a more mature sound, production was handled by a variety of record producers, such as new producers Poo Bear, Maejor Ali, Andre Harris, D.K. the Punisher, Soundz, and the Audibles, as well as previous producers  Chef Tone, T-Minus, Diplo, Darkchild and Sir Nolan. A ten-week digital download campaign entitled Music Mondays, in which one new song was released every Monday night, was held from October 7, 2013, to December 9, 2013. In addition to the songs released on Music Mondays, Journals is also composed of five other previously unreleased songs. The recording sessions took place while Bieber was on his Believe Tour (2012—2013), which generated one or two songs a day throughout the entire tour.

Despite promotion of the album making Bieber reach number one on the Billboard Social 50 popularity chart in the United States and plans for the release to capitalize on the sales rush before Christmas, the album was not submitted for sales tracking to Nielsen SoundScan, thus it did not rank on the US Billboard 200 due to its first-week sales going unreported. It has been certified gold by the RIAA. It reached the top-forty in some countries and debuted in the top 10 only in Denmark and Norway.

The compilation was meant to be released physically, but due to Bieber's record label not fully agreeing with him venturing into R&B for the project, they did not support the album project. It was, however, eventually released on LP in 2016. The album was met with lukewarm reviews from music critics. Although some praised its mature direction and labeled it his best material, others dismissed its similar themes and "unfinished" production. The album has since come to be regarded as a cult favorite among Bieber's fans.

Background and recording 
While touring with his Believe Tour throughout 2012 and 2013, Justin Bieber managed to write new songs every day. According to his manager, Scooter Braun, the writing process had him "writing one to two songs a day for the entire tour and [...] label[ing] them by the city he wr[o]te them in." In January 2013, Bieber confirmed he was writing for a new album, as well as American R&B singer R. Kelly that confirmed he was working with Bieber on the album. Meanwhile, in June of the same year, he confirmed a new album, the rest of the Believe Tour and a movie for 2013. In July, Braun gave an interview for MTV News, where he discussed the album, claiming: "For this project, we want to do things a little bit differently. And there are more songs than 10 or 12, so if you have more music and you have more things you want to express, you gotta think out the box, and [think like] ’How do I get this out there in a unique way where it gets directly to my fans and I can express myself through music directly to them?’ And I think that's what it's about when you have people who are incredibly creative, things happen." In August, Bieber confirmed he was working with American rapper Future. It was also reported he was working with Juicy J, Ludacris and Big Sean. In December, he also confirmed he was working with Chance the Rapper and Lil Wayne.

As executive producer, Justin enlisted previous collaborators such as Rodney Jerkins, Maejor, Diplo and Sir Nolan, while working with a range of new R&B producers such as The Audibles, Andre Harris, D.K. the Punisher, Soundz, Chef Tone, T-Minus, Jason "Poo Bear" Boyd and others. Boyd became one of the most frequent collaborators on the album, writing with Bieber several songs as well as producing some. According to the producer, Bieber suggested they to "flip those Craig David chords and [...] create something." By doing so, he came up with the song "Recovery", a song that was finished at Cherry Beach Sound in Toronto. As he recalled, the process had Bieber hearing Boyd songs and selected them to sing, and many songs from the producer turned into songs off Journals. Boyd continued: "He [Bieber] just felt them so much, so strongly. It was just a matter of me letting go of the fact that I don't care about me being a singer more so than I care about putting great music out into the universe. Then I was able to do it. The songs that I felt like were too mature, we changed them up to fit him like a custom suit."

Composition
An R&B album, Journals steps away from Bieber's more teen-pop sound of his previous efforts, while also having pop influences. As claimed by Spin Brandon Soderberg, "[s]onically, it's up there with Beyoncé in terms of holding tight to the patience of '80s and '90s R&B while never forgetting the sugar-rush rewards of pop." Soderberg also reflected that Bieber was inspired by many R&B artists such as "Aaliyah, Drake, Frank Ocean, Sufjan Stevens, Sade, and Usher out of EDM mode." According to one of its producers, Jason Boyd, "Justin grew up listening to R&B. Journals was trying because it was going against the grain [of what he had been doing sonically], but it served so much of a purpose in him growing up." Chris Martins of Billboard also noted that the album "drew on Boyd's experience writing for 112, Usher and Chris Brown."

The album is composed by many "slow numbers", such as "Hold Tight," "All Bad" and "PYD", which Carl Williot of Idolator considered "racy, restrained jams in the vein of The Weeknd's mixtapes (minus the danger), each utilizing the bare minimum in terms of percussion." "One Life" was also noted for having influences by The Weeknd and Frank Ocean. Williot also noted that "'Roller Coaster' took the disco-pop and pop-funk craze of 2013 and marries it to trap stomps, as well as "freestyle-meets-Sonic the Hedgehog roller-skating grooves", completed Soderberg. "Bad Day" and "Swap It Out" flirt with late nostalgic '90s R&B/bling rap sweet spot, while "Confident" and closer "Memphis" channel Timbaland's prime with their brittle, syncopated percussion and background yelps." "Change Me', as noted by Soderberg, has a "The Tony Rich Project" feel to it, while "Backpack" is a futuristic pop song with a guitar solo. The music is slower and more restrained, with clean-toned electric guitar licks and gently stuttering R&B groove; "Recovery" features a "Craig David-sampling swoon" of "Fill Me In", "All that Matters" pushes Bieber's "earnest vocal into the limelight over an instrumental that relies on little more than swirling guitar strums and plush bass," and "Heartbreaker" features "chords [that] swim in and out of focus over a low-slung groove and vocals [that] float menacingly somewhere over your head" as Fact Aimee Cliff noticed.

Music and lyrics
Journals main themes deal with heartbreak and forgiveness in a romantic relationship, with many critics noting that it was influenced by Bieber's relationship with former girlfriend Selena Gomez. It finds the singer apologizing, taking responsibility for bad behavior and pledging lifelong faithfulness, while also talking about sex in some songs. Adam R. Holz of Plugged In noted that "'Journals' is a mournfully desperate, frequently "freaky" set of songs that finds the 19-year-old Canadian singer begging for a second chance with an ex. And it's tempting to buy in to Justin Bieber's repeated pleas for one last loop-around with his beloved. That's because the painfully plaintive nature of his repeated pleas gives him an air of wounded authenticity. It's not hard to believe that he really has lost the one girl (Selena Gomez) who means everything to him, and that he'll do anything to win her back."

The first song, "Heartbreaker" co-produced by Maejor, finds Bieber begging for his lover to not break his heart, "suggest[ing] that while he's got real flaws, those shouldn't completely disqualify him" and "pledg[ing] love through ups and downs, good times and bad." "I know the seasons may change/And sometimes love goes from sunshine to rain/ … I still believe in us/I still believe in love," he sings. "All That Matters" continues in the same vein, with lines like: "Oh, oh, whenever you're not in my presence/It feels like I'm missing my blessings, yeah." "Hold Tight" "focuses almost exclusively on sex," while "Recovery" finds Bieber " taking responsibility for mistakes and praying for a second chance." "Bad Day" and "All Bad" shared similarities, with the first talking about a painful break-up, while the latter has him "assuring a lover that the haters have him all wrong" and, according to Holz, making a "meanspirited and sexist accusation" about how "females like to run their mouths." "PYD" features Bieber and R. Kelly singing about "having sex with a woman in just about as many locations as they can brainstorm. The titular acronym stands for "put you down," a slang reference to sex."

The eighth track, "Roller Coaster", which references "Ohio Players' 1970s hit "Love Rollercoaster", talks about the loneliness of long-distance loving, while the piano ballad "Change Me" is about "accepting responsibility before proposing a solution to a problem he didn't even have." "Confident" talks about someone he's apparently just spied, while Chance the Rapper also talks about the song's main subject. "One Life", co-written by Drake, "offers another take on those sorts of faithfulness pledges", having a "YOLO [you only live once] with a conscience" theme. "Backpack" finds Bieber "fall[ing] in love with an alien girl whom he desires to 'stay in my backpack forever'." "What's Hatnin'" focuses on conflict resolution and forgiveness, "Swap It Out" "looks into the complicated feelings that go into a relationship," and "Memphis" "finds Bieber exploring a relationship, wherein he wants to be with his butterfly-giving girl 24/7." The bonus song, "Flatline", "explores a failed relationship, due to his busy schedule and the girl in question always contacting him at the wrong times, then not returning the phone calls he attempts to make."

Release and promotion
On October 3, 2013, Bieber announced that he would release one new song every Monday for 10 weeks, leading up to the release of his Believe theatrical film, which saw a limited one-week release on Christmas Day 2013. Each of the singles released has its own original artwork, featuring a white and purple theme. The album and single's artwork was designed by Todd Russell. The first song issued during "Music Mondays", as Bieber had touted the weekly releases, "Heartbreaker", was issued on October 7, 2013. The song reached the top of the Denmark charts, the top-ten in other three countries and peaked inside the top-twenty on the US Billboard Hot 100, the UK Singles Chart and other five territories. The second song, "All That Matters", was released on October 14, 2013, and was the first to receive a music video treatment, released on December 2, 2013. It was another number-one single in Denmark, while reaching the top-twenty in eight countries, including the United Kingdom. In the United States, it reached number 24. "Hold Tight" was the third, released on October 21, 2013, and also his third consecutive number-one in Denmark; elsewhere it reached the top-forty in over ten countries, followed by "Recovery" and "Bad Day", released on October 28, 2013, and November 4, 2013, respectively, with both reaching the top-forty in many countries, while the latter becoming the album's fourth number-one single in Denmark. The other five subsequent singles, "All Bad", "PYD", "Roller Coaster", "Change Me" and "Confident", were released each a week and attained moderate impact on the charts worldwide, with "Roller Coaster" and "Confident" also reaching the top of Denmark charts, and the latter also receiving a music video treatment.

On December 9, 2013, Bieber announced that the ten Music Monday releases would be packaged with an additional five new songs in a compilation entitled Complete My Journals. Although the album was initially set for release on December 16, 2013, the date was pushed back one week to December 23, as Bieber intended to include one more song on the compilation. Though it does not appear on the album itself, the bonus track, "Flatline", was available for a free download on the iTunes Store for a limited time. Journals was available on iTunes from January 2, 2014, and all sixteen songs are available for purchase individually. According to one of its producers and Bieber's personal friend, Jason "Poo Bear" Boyd, the album was supposed to receive a full release, as well as its singles to be promoted on radio, however the label didn't support it because it wasn't the direction they wanted Justin to go. It was, however, eventually released on LP in 2016.

On May 29, 2014, the song "Looking For You", which features hip hop trio, Migos and produced by Danja, was released on SoundCloud. It was possibly going to appear on the album, but never made the final cut due to never being released.

Critical reception

Journals was met with lukewarm reviews, with most music critics noting his artistic growth. In a positive review, Mikael Wood of Los Angeles Times praised the "tunes that take up his evolving reputation with surprising candor" as well as the fact that "he's using that voice to confront the awkward aging-in-public process head-on." He also called the album "a come-to-Jesus moment that has nothing to do with Christmas." Jim Farber of New York Daily News noted that Journals "has a cohesion nowhere evident on the Bieb’s three previous studio CDs," while also praising the album for "find[ing] an energy in Bieber’s deepening personality" and the music that "finds him more fully engaged." Aimee Cliff wrote for Fact that the album is "a resounding achievement" and "trumps at every turn with its secret weapon: subtlety," while Brandon Soderberg of Spin called it "a cohesive, well-paced collection of narcotic R&B," claiming that the album's "elegance is conveyed via denser production choices and our host’s artful crooning." Ben Rayner of Toronto Star applauded Bieber's voice, calling it "sufficiently well suited to the material that he can almost sell his new persona." Rayner also acknowledged that " tunes are often surprisingly interesting from a production standpoint," however he pointed out that "there’s too much of the same."

Niko John of Absolute Punk went on to write that "'Journals' is undoubtedly his greatest work to date and shows a more mature, sexual side to the Canadian pop-star. However, it is an experiment that at times works and at others feels like Bieber is trying way too hard to discard his boy image." Sandeep Singh of Verdens Gang wrote that Journals is "neither a profound diary or a studio album it could have been [...] But this is undoubtedly the best Bieber has bubbled up to now." The Washington Posts Alison Stewart offered a negative outlook on the project, writing that "Justin Bieber ends a bad year with a bad album." In his review written for the Milwaukee Journal Sentinel, Piet Levy wrote that Bieber is "less an eager child than a confident adult, although when Bieber's flat come-ons are juxtaposed with seasoned R&B star R. Kelly on "PYD," it's clear that as a performer, he still has a lot of growing up to do."

Track listing

Notes
 signifies a co-producer.
 signifies a vocal producer.
"Recovery" contains samples of "Fill Me In", written by Craig David and Mark Hill.
"Bad Day" contains samples of "Footsteps in the Dark", written by Ernest Isley, Marvin Isley, O'Kelly Isley Jr., Ronald Isley, Rudolph Isley and Christopher Jasper.
"Memphis" contains samples of "Nights Off", written by Friedrich Moritz.

Charts

Weekly charts

Year-end charts

Certifications

Release history

References

2013 compilation albums
Compilation albums by Canadian artists
Island Records compilation albums
Justin Bieber albums
Albums produced by Justin Bieber
Albums produced by Maejor
Albums produced by T-Minus (record producer)
Albums produced by Poo Bear
Albums produced by Diplo
Albums produced by Rodney Jerkins